Quinuclidine is an organic compound and a bicyclic amine and used as a catalyst and a chemical building block. It is a strong base with pKa of the conjugate acid of 11.0. It can be prepared by reduction of quinuclidone.

In alkane solvents quinuclidine is a Lewis base that forms adducts with a variety of Lewis acids.

The compound is structurally related to DABCO, in which the other bridgehead is also nitrogen, and to tropane, which has a slightly different carbon frame.

Quinuclidine is found as a structural component of some biomolecules including quinine.

References